5F-MDMB-PICA is a designer drug and synthetic cannabinoid.  In 2018, it was the fifth-most common synthetic cannabinoid identified in drugs seized by the Drug Enforcement Administration.

5F-MDMB-PICA is a potent agonist of both the CB1 receptor and the CB2 receptor with EC50 values of 0.45 nM and 7.4 nM, respectively.

In the United States, 5F-MDMB-PICA was temporarily emergency scheduled by the DEA in 2019. In December 2019, the UNODC announced scheduling recommendations placing 5F-MDMB-PICA into Schedule II. In the United States 5F-MDMB-PICA was made a permanent Schedule I Controlled Substance nationwide on April 7, 2022.

References

Further reading 
 

Cannabinoids
Designer drugs
Indolecarboxamides
Organofluorides